Grodna can refer to
Grodno, a city in Belarus
Grodna (Blake) the mythological character from the writings of William Blake
Grodna, Greater Poland Voivodeship (west-central Poland)